Yemrehana Krestos (Yəmrəḥannä Krəstos, often referred to as "Yəmrəḥa" in the sources) was the third king of the Zagwe dynasty, ruling during the second half of the twelfth century. His biography is recorded in the Gädlä Yəmrəḥannä Krəstos.

Reign
He was the son of King Germa Seyum (Gǝrwa Śǝyyum), and the successor of his father's brother Tatadim  (Ṭänṭäwǝdǝm). His birth name may have been Abraham. Although his uncle tried to kill him, to prevent his succession, his mother hid him. He became a priest and then succeeded his uncle when he died. According to a manuscript Pedro Páez and Manuel de Almeida saw at Axum, he ruled for 40 years.

A council presided over by Yemrehana Krestos condemned Syrian and Egyptian monks who taught that the body of Jesus Christ was not of the same nature as most human beings, and as a result they were persecuted and driven out of the places in which they were living.

Accomplishments 
Yemrehana Krestos constructed a lavish stone church in the Aksumite style, ornamented with objects from Egypt. Located 12 miles northeast from Lalibela, the Yemrehana Krestos Church was built in a large northeast-facing cave on the western side of Mount Abuna Yosef. Until the construction of a road in 2000, this church was reachable only after "a long day's arduous journey on foot or mule".

Reputation 
Some believe that he is the Ethiopian king who inspired the myth of Prester John. Taddesse Tamrat describes him as the king of Ethiopia closest to a priest, noting that he insisted on ruling Ethiopia according to Apostolic canons. Stuart Munro-Hay speculates that "Abu Salih's description of the kings of Abyssinia as priests might have been based on information about this ruler that had reached Egypt.

Francisco Alvarez stated that Yemrehana Krestos began the tradition of confining rival heirs to the Imperial throne at Amba Geshen, although this is disputed. 

The Italian scholar Carlo Conti Rossini incorrectly argued that Yemrehana Krestos was the successor of Na'akueto La'ab, and succeeded by Yetbarak.

References

Further reading 
 Marie-Laure Derat ,  "King and priest and Prester John: analysis of the Life of a 12th century Ethiopian king, Yemrehanna Krestos", Annales d'Ethiopie, 27 (2012), pp. 323-326 

11th-century monarchs in Africa
Emperors of Ethiopia
Zagwe dynasty